Old Hill is an unincorporated community in northern Lewis Township, Clay County, Indiana. It is located near the intersection of Lewis Township with Harrison and Perry Townships. Old Hill is part of the Terre Haute Metropolitan Statistical Area.

Geography

References

Unincorporated communities in Clay County, Indiana
Unincorporated communities in Indiana
Terre Haute metropolitan area